Vachellia nilotica subsp. kraussiana is a perennial tree native to Africa.  All examples in southern Africa can be assigned to this race.

Uses

Its uses include chemical products and wood. The bark is used to treat cough by the African Zulu.

References

nilotica subsp. kraussiana
Plant subspecies